The 2016–17 Eastern Michigan Eagles women's basketball team will represent Eastern Michigan University during the 2016–17 NCAA Division I women's basketball season. The Eagles, led by first year head coach Fred Castro, will play their home games at the Convocation Center, as members of the West Division of the Mid-American Conference.

Schedule

|-
!colspan=9 style="background:#006633; color:#FFFFFF;"| Non-conference regular season

|-
!colspan=9 style="background:#006633; color:#FFFFFF;"| MAC regular season

|-
!colspan=9 style="background:#006633; color:#FFFFFF;"| MAC Tournament

References

See also
 2016–17 Eastern Michigan Eagles men's basketball team

Eastern Michigan Eagles women's basketball seasons
Eastern Michigan
Eastern Michigan Eagles women's basketball
Eastern Michigan Eagles women's basketball